Publius Herennius Dexippus (c. 210–273 AD), Greek historian, statesman and general, was an hereditary priest of the Eleusinian family of the Kerykes, and held the offices of archon basileus and eponymous in Athens.

Life
When the Heruli overran Greece and captured Athens (267), Dexippus showed great personal courage and revived the spirit of patriotism among his  fellow-countrymen. A statue was set up in his honour, the base of which, with an inscription recording his services, has been preserved. It is remarkable that the inscription is silent as to his military achievements.

Photius speaks very highly of the style of Dexippus, whom he calls a second Thucydides.

Works 
Photius (cod. 82) mentions three historical works by Dexippus, of which considerable fragments remain:

Τὰ μετ᾽ Ἀλέξανδρον (The Events after Alexander), apparently an epitome of a work by Arrian
Σκυθικά (Scythica), a history of the wars of Rome with the Goths (called Scythians in archaizing language) in the 3rd century
Χρονικὴ ἱστορία (Chronike Historia) in twelve books, probably covering a thousand years to the reign of the emperor Claudius Gothicus (270)

The Chronicle was continued by Eunapius of Sardis, who opens his own history with a critique of his predecessor. The Chronicle also appears to be the primary source of the Historia Augusta between 238 and 270, but Paschoud has demonstrated that the author of the Historia Augusta sometimes attributes material to Dexippus falsely, and so this evidence must be used with caution.

References

Sources
 Gunther Martin: Dexipp von Athen. Edition, Übersetzung und begleitende Studien. Tübingen 2006 (edition and German translation).
 Laura Mecella, Dexippo di Atene. Testimonianze e frammenti. Introduzione, edizione, tradizione e commento. Tivoli 2013.
 Fergus Millar (1969) "P. Herennius Dexippus: The Greek World and the Third-century Invasions," Journal of Roman Studies 59: 12–29.
François Paschoud (1991) "L'Histoire Auguste et Dexippe," in G. Bonamente et al., eds., Historiae Augustae Colloquium Parisinum, 217–69.

External links
Dexippus' Fragments in Dindorf's 1870 Minor Greek Historians

210 births
273 deaths
3rd-century historians
3rd-century clergy
3rd-century Greek people
3rd-century Romans
Eleusinian hierophants
Roman-era Greek priests
Roman-era Athenians
Ancient Roman generals
Greek-language historians from the Roman Empire
Dexippus, Publius
Eponymous archons